Michael Edward Darr (born March 23, 1956) is an American former professional baseball pitcher. He played in one game for the Toronto Blue Jays of Major League Baseball (MLB) in their inaugural 1977 season.

Early years
Mike attended Norco High School in Norco, CA.

Career
Darr was selected by the Baltimore Orioles in 4th round (96th overall) in the 1974 Major League Baseball Draft, but never played for them. He then was selected by Toronto Blue Jays in the 2nd round (17th overall) of the 1976 expansion draft. 

Darr appeared in just one game for the Blue Jays on September 6, 1977, at Exhibition Stadium against the Boston Red Sox. He was the starting pitcher that day against "Spaceman" Bill Lee. He pitched an inning and a third before being pulled and replaced by Tom Murphy. He gave up three hits, five runs, four walks, hit one batter with a pitch, had one strike-out. He gave up a first inning grand slam to Carlton Fisk. Darr earned the losing decision in the game and finished with an ERA of 33.75. Afterwards he was sent down to play in their minor league system and did not appear again in a major league game.

He was the father of Mike Darr, a San Diego Padres outfielder who died at age 25 in a car accident in 2002.

References

External links

1956 births
Living people
American expatriate baseball players in Canada
Baseball players from California
Bluefield Orioles players
Cardenales de Lara players
American expatriate baseball players in Venezuela
Charlotte O's players
Jersey City Indians players
Kinston Eagles players
Lodi Orioles players
Major League Baseball pitchers
Miami Orioles players
Syracuse Chiefs players
Toronto Blue Jays players